Prince of the Plains is a 1949 American Western film directed by Philip Ford and written by Louise Rousseau and Albert DeMond. The film stars Monte Hale, Paul Hurst, Shirley Davis, Roy Barcroft, Rory Mallinson and Harry Lauter. The film was released on April 8, 1949, by Republic Pictures.

Plot

Cast    
Monte Hale as Bat Masterson
Paul Hurst as Sheriff Hank Hartley
Shirley Davis as Julie Phillips
Roy Barcroft as Henchman Regan
Rory Mallinson as James Taylor
Harry Lauter as Tom Owens
Lane Bradford as Henchman Keller
George M. Carleton as Sam Phillips

References

External links 
 

1949 films
American Western (genre) films
1949 Western (genre) films
Republic Pictures films
Films directed by Philip Ford
American black-and-white films
1940s English-language films
1940s American films